Malaysia competed in the 2012 Asian Beach Games held in Haiyang, China from 16 to 22 June 2012. Malaysia failed to win a single medal in the games.

References

Malaysia
2012 in Malaysian sport